The Metropolitanate of Zagreb and Ljubljana is an Eastern Orthodox eparchy (diocese) and one of the five honorary metropolitanates of the Serbian Orthodox Church. The headquarters of the metropolia is located in Zagreb, Croatia, and its jurisdiction covers northern Croatia and the entire territory of Slovenia.

History
During the Middle Ages, Slovenia was under Habsburg rule, while the neighbouring Banate of Slavonia was under the rule of Hungarian kings. Some eastern regions of medieval Slavonia were inhabited by Serbs, who settled there after fleeing Bosnia during the 15th century, even before the Ottoman conquest of Bosnia in 1463. In 1438, Pope Eugene IV sent the inquisitor Giacomo della Marca to Slavonia as a missionary to baptize "schismatic" Serbs in "Roman religion", and if that failed, to banish them. In 1454, the Serbian Orthodox liturgical book Varaždin Apostol was written in Upper-Slavonian city of Varaždin, for princess Katarina Branković of Serbia, wife of Ulrich II, Count of Celje.

In the first half of the 16th century, Slavonia was devastated by frequent wars. The eastern part (Lower Slavonia) was conquered by the Ottomans, while the western part (Upper Slavonia) came under Habsburg rule. Since the renewal of the Serbian Patriarchate of Peć in 1557, the Orthodox Serbs of Lower Slavonia were placed under the jurisdiction of the Eparchy of Požega, centered at the Orahovica Monastery. In 1595, the Serbian Orthodox metropolitan Vasilije of Požega moved to Upper Slavonia, under Habsburg rule, in order to avoid Turkish oppression. His successors were headquartered in the Marča Monastery. In those areas, Serb migrants served as soldiers of the Varaždin Generalate. During the 17th century, bishops of Marča led the difficult fight against Roman Catholic proselytism.

In addition to Marča Monastery, the other spiritual center of Orthodox Serbs in the area was and still is Lepavina Monastery. Abbot Kondrat of Lepavina was killed in 1716, defending the purity of the Orthodox faith. He was killed by those Serbs who had become Catholics. In 1734 the headquarters moved to a monastery at Lepavina and the diocese was called "Eparchy of Lepavina". Serbian Orthodox bishop Simeon Filipović of Lepavina (1734-1743) also had residence in Sjeverin. After his death and several years of administration, the Eparchy of Lepavina was abolished, and in 1750 its territory came under the jurisdiction of the Serbian Orthodox bishops of Kostajnica. In 1771, the region came under the jurisdiction of the Orthodox bishops of Pakrac, and that remained until 1931.

20th century
Soon after the creation of the Kingdom of Serbs, Croats and Slovenes (1918), all Serbian Orthodox ecclesiastical provinces were merged into the united Serbian Orthodox Church in 1920. Since the city of Zagreb was the second capital of the kingdom, initiative was revived for the restoration of the old "Eparchy of Lepavina" under newly proposed name "Eparchy of Zagreb". After long preparations, the region was detached from the Eparchy of Pakrac in 1931, and the new Serbian Orthodox Eparchy of Zagreb was created, with its bishop receiving the honorary title of Metropolitan.

The first Eastern Orthodox Metropolitan of Zagreb was Dositej Vasić, a learned theologian and man of broad vision and understanding in relations with other nations and religions. In spite of that, after the Nazi occupation of Yugoslavia in World War II and the creation of the Independent State of Croatia (1941), he was arrested and tortured. As a consequence, he died in 1945, exiled from his eparchy.

After World War II, the Zagreb metropolitanate and other dioceses in the territory of Croatia were administered by auxiliary (vicarian) bishop Arsenije Bradvarević. He was succeeded by Damascus Grdanički, previously Bishop of Banat, and after his death in 1969, the metropolitanate was administered by the Bishop of Slavonia, Emilian Marinović.

At the regular session of the Holy Assembly of the Serbian Orthodox Church in 1977, the spiritual guidance of this metropolitanate was entrusted to vicarian bishop Jovan Pavlović of Lepavina, who was elected Metropolitan of Zagreb in 1982. The following year, the name of the eparchy was expanded into Eparchy of Zagreb and Ljubljana. On the proposal of the metropolit Jovan, the name of the eparchy was expanded once more in 1994 into "Metropolitanate of Zagreb-Ljubljana and all Italy". Jurisdiction over Serbian Orthodox churches in Italy, that was transferred to the metropolitanate in 1994, lasted until 2011.

Metropolit Jovan organized the meeting of Serbian Patriarch Pavle and Cardinal Franjo Kuharić (first in the spring of 1991 in Sremski Karlovci, and the other later in Slavonski Brod). He also organized a meeting of Patriarch Pavle and the Croatian President Franjo Tuđman.

21st century 
In 2014, bishop Porfirije Perić was elected Metropolitan of Zagreb and Ljubljana and enthroned in Zagreb on 13 July by Serbian Patriarch Irinej.

On 18 February 2021, Metropolitan Porfirije was elected as the new Patriarch of the Serbian Orthodox Church.

Bishops and metropolitans 
Orthodox bishops and metropolitans who had jurisdiction over the territory of present-day Metropolitanate of Zagreb and Ljubljana

Bishops of Marča 
 Maksim Predojević (1630–1642)
 Gavrilo Predojević (1642–1644)
 Vasilije Predojević (1644–1648)
 Sava Stanislavić (1648–1661)
 Gavrilo Mijakić (1661–1671)

Since 1705, under jurisdiction of Orthodox Bishops of Pakrac.

Eparchy of Lepavina 
 Simeon Filipović (1734–1743)
 (1743–1750) administration

Bishops of Kostajnica 
 Arsenije Teofanović (1750–1753)
 Josif Stojanović (1754–1771)

After 1771, again under jurisdiction of Bishops of Pakrac.

Metropolitans 
The following is a list of metropolitan bishops since 1931:

See also 
 Serbs of Croatia
 Eastern Orthodoxy in Croatia
 List of the Eparchies of the Serbian Orthodox Church

References

Sources

 
 
 
 
 Vjerske zajednice u Hrvatskoj, Zagreb: Prometej, 2008.

External links
 Official website; accessed 6 June 2015. 
 Lepavina monastery webpage; accessed 6 June 2015. 
 The Serbs in the Former SR of Croatia
 His All-Holiness Ecumenical Patriarch Bartholomew in Zagreb
 Spiritual Genocide: The Diocese of Zagreb-ljubljana